P. R. N. Thirumurugan is an Indian politician from All India NR Congress. In 2011, he was elected as a member of the Puducherry Legislative Assembly from Karaikal North (constituency). He defeated A. V. Subramanian of Indian National Congress by 12,569 votes in 2021 Puducherry Assembly election.

References 

Living people
Year of birth missing (living people)
21st-century Indian politicians
People from Puducherry
All India NR Congress politicians
Indian National Congress politicians
Puducherry MLAs 2011–2016
Puducherry MLAs 2016–2021
Puducherry MLAs 2021–2026